United Baloch Army (UBA) was a militant group, fighting for the separation of Balochistan. The group has been designated as a terrorist organisation by the Pakistani government. The government of Pakistan banned the group on 15 March 2013. The group has also been classified as a terrorist organisation by Switzerland's government.

The group is led by Mehran Marri and was created as a result of an intrafamilial dispute between Mehran and his brother Hyrbyair Marri, the head of the Balochistan Liberation Army (BLA). BLA fighters accused Mehran of stealing $3 million dollars from their funds and $800 million rupees worth of weapons from the BLA. The BLA and the Baloch Republican Army have both condemned UBA attacks as self-destructive. Both Baloch Liberation Army (BLA) and United Baloch Army (UBA) have clashed with each other. The deadliest clash took place in Dera Bugti where 20 militants from both groups were killed.

On 29 May 2015, United Baloch Army (UBA) militants stormed two buses in Mastung district that were in transit from Pishin to Karachi. The militants emptied the buses and then shot and killed 22 ethnic Pashtuns.

United Baloch Army (UBA) also claimed responsibility for attack on the Jaffar Express in Sibi on 8 April 2014. The attack claimed the lives of 16 people and wounded 44 others.

On 16 November 2017, Mehran Marri was arrested at Zurich Airport by Swiss immigration authorities. Mehran Marri was placed under a lifetime ban from entry into Switzerland. Swiss authorities issued a chargesheet in which they stated that Mehran Marri is the head of United Baloch Army (UBA). The chargesheet further stated that "if Marri was to enter Switzerland and work with Brahamdagh Bugti to coordinate terrorist operations, it could jeopardize the internal security of the country".

In January 2022, The Baloch Republican Army merged with the UBA, to form Baloch Nationalist Army (BNA). BRA and UBA also announced their dissolution following the establishment of Baloch Nationalist Army.

References

Organisations designated as terrorist by Pakistan
Baloch nationalist militant groups
Rebel groups in Pakistan